Papakonstantinou is a Greek surname. It means "The Family of Father Constantine" (father referring to the priesthood). It is the surname of:

 Alex P Alexander "Alex P" Papaconstantinou, Greek-Swedish songwriter and music producer
 Anastasios Papakonstantinou (born 1963), Greek bobsledder 
 Anthi Papakonstantinou (born 1995), Greek footballer 
 Elli Papakonstantinou,  stage director, librettist, translator and activist
 Giorgos Papakonstantinou (born 1961), Greek finance minister
 Michalis Papakonstantinou, (1919–2010), Greek politician, Minister for Foreign Affairs
 Thanassis Papakonstantinou (born 1959), Greek folk-rock singer and songwriter
 Theofylaktos Papakonstantinou (1905–1991), Greek journalist, writer and politician
 Vasilis Papakonstantinou (born 1950), Greek rock singer

Greek-language surnames
Surnames
Patronymic surnames